McIver railway station is a railway station on the Transperth network in Perth, Western Australia. It is located on the Armadale/Thornlie line, Midland line and Airport line, 0.9 kilometres from Perth station, providing access to Royal Perth Hospital.

History
The station was opened on 1 September 1989 and named after Ken McIver, a long serving steam engine driver and Labor member of the Western Australian Legislative Assembly for Northam and Avon from 1968 until 1986. The station was purpose-built to provide access directly to Royal Perth Hospital.

Platforms

McIver station is one of the two stations that service both the Midland and Armadale/Thornlie lines, with the other station being Claisebrook. The station saw 564,672 passengers in the 2013-14 financial year.

The following platforms are currently in use at McIver:

It is set to receive Airport line services commencing on 9 October 2022.

Bus routes

References

Railway stations in Australia opened in 1989
Railway stations in Perth, Western Australia
Airport line, Perth